Hawthorne Branch Library No. 2, also known as Hawthorne Education Annex, is a historic Carnegie library building located in Indianapolis, Marion County, Indiana. Built in 1909–1911, with funds provided by the Carnegie Foundation, it is a one-story, rectangular, Classical Revival style brick and limestone building on a raised basement. It has a truncated hipped roof and features a slightly projecting pavilion housing a round arch. It was renovated in 1955, after its closure as a library, and again in 1999.

The building was added to the National Register of Historic Places in 2000. The building no longer contains a public library. Since 2000, it houses the offices of the Hawthorne Social Services Association, a local non-profit.

See also
List of Carnegie libraries in Indiana

References

Carnegie libraries in Indiana
Libraries on the National Register of Historic Places in Indiana
Neoclassical architecture in Indiana
Library buildings completed in 1911
Buildings and structures in Indianapolis
National Register of Historic Places in Indianapolis